Brecht is a 2019 TV docudrama film, dealing with the life and work of the German playwright Bertolt Brecht. A co-production between Bavaria Fiction in Germany, Satel Film in Austria and MIA Film in the Czech Republic, principal photography occurred in and around Prague from 30 May to 28 July 2017. Formed of two 90-minute parts, it was scripted and directed by Heinrich Breloer, with Tom Schilling and Burghart Klaußner in the title role. It premiered at the Berlinale 2019.

Plot 
The film focusses more on Brecht's relationships with women (namely Paula Banholzer, Marianne Zoff, Helene Weigel, Elisabeth Hauptmann, Ruth Berlau, Käthe Reichel, Regine Lutz and Isot Kilian) than on his plays and poems. It does not mention the term epic theatre (though rehearsal scenes in Part 2 illustrate his working process with the Berliner Ensemble) and his years of exile are skipped - Bresloer has written:

"Naturally I would also like to have treated his exile. But that would have been a very particular film and there wasn't enough budget or airtime for it. In my novel about the film, however, exile does come up, especially his time with Margarete Steffin.''

Part of the film consists of an account by Martin Pohl, one of Brecht's Masters students, who was imprisoned for two years - it tells how he was tortured by sleep deprivation and gave a false confession.

Part 1
This deals with Brecht's time in Augsburg, Munich and Berlin before his exile. "I'll come right behind Goethe" muses the slight and shy-looking 17-year-old schoolboy to his young love Paula, wanting to be the latest genius. His friends laugh with him at his presumptuousness and yet believe him.

Part 2
This mainly deals with his life and work in East Berlin after his return from exile, such as his work with the SED regime in East Germany. This includes the SED central committee's 1953 plan to hand over the Theater am Schiffbauerdamm to the Kasernierten Volkspolizei ensemble (later known as the Erich-Weinert-Ensemble) and Brecht's successful appeal to Otto Grotewohl against this. That venue has thus housed the Berliner Ensemble (founded by Brecht and Weigel in 1949) since 1954.

Cast
 Tom Schilling: Brecht as a young man
 Burghart Klaußner: Brecht as an older man in the post-war period
 Lou Strenger: Helene Weigel as a young woman
 Adele Neuhauser: Helene Weigel as an older woman
 Mala Emde: Paula Banholzer, Brecht's first love
 Friederike Becht: Marianne Zoff, Brecht's first wife
 Leonie Benesch: Elisabeth Hauptmann, Brecht's translator and collaborator
 Trine Dyrholm: Ruth Berlau, Brecht's Danish lover and collaborator
 Franz Hartwig: Caspar Neher, a friend of Brecht
 Anatole Taubman: Ernst Josef Aufricht, director of the Theater am Schiffbauerdamm
 Thimo Meitner: Walter Brecht, Brecht's brother
 Anna Herrmann: Käthe Reichel
 Maria Dragus: Regine Lutz 
 Laura de Boer: Isot Kilian

Accuracy

Reception

External links (in German) 
 arte: „Brecht“ - Interview mit Heinrich Breloer und Burkhart Klaussner
 Bavaria Fiction:  Brecht TV-Event
 Berliner Zeitung: Heinrich Breloer im Interview Über Brecht und des Teufels erstklassige Arbeit
 Das Erste: „Brecht“ – Halbzeit bei den Dreharbeiten zu Heinrich Breloers neuem Zweiteiler
 Kiepenheuer & Witsch: Heinrich Breloers Buch über Bertolt Brecht: Ein Denkmal wird lebendig.
 
 
 Brecht on berlinale.de

References 

Bertolt Brecht
Drama television films
Austrian television films
German television films
Czech television films
2019 television films
2019 biographical drama films
Biographical films about dramatists and playwrights
German biographical films
Austrian biographical films
Czech biographical films
German docudrama films
2010s German-language films
Films set in the 1910s
Films set in the 1920s
Films set in the 1930s
Films set in the 1950s
Films set in East Germany
Films set in Munich
Films set in Berlin
2010s German films
Das Erste original programming